Pubs, Parks, Theatres, Clubs, Church Halls, Gardens, Lounges & Band Rotundas is a 2006 album by New Zealand band Th' Dudes. This five-track CD features alternative versions of the band's most popular songs, and was put together at the time of their 2006 reunion tour when Stebbing Studios showed no interest in re-releasing the band's back catalogue. The album was only available at venues for their tour.

Track listing
"Chinese"
"Quite Frankly"
"Right First Time"
"Walking in Light"
"Bliss"

References

2006 albums
Th' Dudes albums
Self-released albums